St Thomas of Canterbury's Church, Camelford is a church in the Church of England Diocese of Truro in Camelford, Cornwall. It is a chapel-of-ease in the parish of Lanteglos-by-Camelford.

History
The church was built between 1937 and 1938 to the designs of the architect Charles Nicholson. The Cowlard family of Launceston). gave the medieval font. Pevsner describes it as A minor delight. It sits well on a slightly elevated site above the main road, its modest scale and use of local Delabole slate combining well with an understated Romanesque style...

There was in medieval times a chapel of St Thomas in the town which probably fell into disuse after the Reformation (it is recorded in 1312).

Parish status
The church is in a joint benefice with:
St Adwen's Church, Advent
St Julitta's Church, Lanteglos-by-Camelford

Stained glass
The church has two good windows by famous designers:
Chancel east window, 1938 by Martin Travers
South Chapel east window, 1938 by Theodora Salusbury

References

Camelford
Churches completed in 1938
Camelford